British Club may refer to:

British Club (Bangkok), a social club in Thailand
British Club (football), a football club in Mexico

See also
Gentlemen's club, a type of social club originally set up by men from Britain's upper classes, of which many in the British colonies bore the name British Club
List of football clubs in the United Kingdom